Heliconia vellerigera is a plant species in the family Heliconiaceae, native to Colombia, Ecuador, Peru and Costa Rica. It is a large herb up to 6 m (20 feet) tall with a pendulous inflorescence of 20-30 red-orange bracts covered with cinnamon-colored hairs.

References

External links
 Heliconia vellerigera observations on iNaturalist

vellerigera
Flora of Colombia
Flora of Costa Rica
Flora of Ecuador
Flora of Peru